Kuala Semantan is a state constituency in Pahang, Malaysia, that is represented in the Pahang State Legislative Assembly.

Demographics

History

Polling districts 
According to the federal gazette issued on 30 March 2018, the Kuala Semantan constituency is divided into 15 polling districts.

Representation history

Election results

References 

Pahang state constituencies